Southeast Magnolia is a neighborhood in Seattle, Washington. The city's Department of Neighborhoods places it on the southeast side of Magnolia.

References

Magnolia, Seattle